The 2018 Big West Conference women's basketball tournament took place March 6–10, 2018, at two venues in the Los Angeles area. The first two rounds were scheduled for Titan Gym in Fullerton, California, while the semifinals and championship were held at the Honda Center in Anaheim. Cal State Northridge, the winner of the Big West tournament received the conference's automatic bid to the 2018 NCAA Women's Division I Basketball Tournament.

Seeds

Schedule

Bracket

See also
 2018 Big West Conference men's basketball tournament

References

External links
2018 Big West Women's Basketball Championship

Big West Conference women's basketball tournament
2017–18 Big West Conference women's basketball season